John Laval (September 21, 1854 – June 4, 1937) was an American bishop of the Catholic Church. He served as auxiliary bishop of the Archdiocese of New Orleans from 1911 to 1937.

Biography
Born in Saint-Étienne, Loire, France, Laval was ordained a priest for the Archdiocese of New Orleans on November 10, 1877.  On September 7, 1911 Pope Pius X appointed him as the Titular Bishop of Hierocaesarea and Auxiliary Bishop of New Orleans.  He was consecrated a bishop by Archbishop James Blenk, S.M. on November 29, 1911. The principal co-consecrators were Bishops Cornelius Van de Ven of Alexandria in Louisiana and John Shaw of San Antonio.  He continued to serve as an auxiliary bishop until his death on June 4, 1937, at the age of 82.  He is buried in the Cathedral-Basilica of Saint Louis King of France in New Orleans.

References

Episcopal succession

1854 births
1937 deaths
People from Saint-Étienne
French emigrants to the United States
Roman Catholic Archdiocese of New Orleans
20th-century American Roman Catholic titular bishops
Roman Catholic bishops in Louisiana